CBEA may stand for:
  
 Cell Broadband Engine Architecture, the microprocessor architecture in the PlayStation 3

 Consciousness-Based Education Association, a 501(c) foundation with ties to Maharishi Mahesh Yogi
 Confederação Brasileira de Esqui-Aquático, a Brazilian water ski confederation